In France there are many magazines which are mostly literary magazines, women's magazines and news magazines. One of the early literary magazines, Nouvelles de la république des lettres, was launched by Pierre Bayle in France in 1684. In 1996 there were 2,761 magazine titles. As of 2004 the total number of magazines increased to 4,500. The same year consumer magazines sold about 641,000 copies and business magazines sold nearly 219,000 copies in France.

The following is an incomplete list of current and defunct magazines published in France. They are published in French or other languages.

0-9
 20 Ans
 2512
 30 millions d'amis

A

 Abu Naddara
 Acéphale
 L'Aérophile
 The Africa Report
 Les Ailes
 Almanach des Muses
 Alternatives économiques
 Amina
 L'Anarchie
 Les Annales du Théâtre et de la Musique
 L'Arche
 L'Architecture d'Aujourd'hui
 L'Architecture Vivante
 Argile
 L'Art culinaire
 Artistic Japan
 ArTitudes
 L'Assiette au Beurre
 L'Atelier du roman
 Automobile Year
 L'Autre Afrique
 Avantages

B
 Basket News

C

 Cabinet des Modes
 Cahiers d'art
 Cahiers du Cinéma
 Cahiers Octave Mirbeau
 Cahiers pour l'Analyse
 Les Cahiers du Sud
 La Caricature (1830–1843)
 La Caricature (1880–1904)
 Le Censeur
 Challenges
 Le Charivari
 Charlie Hebdo
 Charlie Mensuel
 Le Chasseur français
 Cibles
 Cinémagazine
 Cinémonde
 Ciné-Mondial
 Cénit
 Clara
 Classica
 La Clochette
 Clubic
 Cocorico
 Confidentiel
  Le Courrier français (1884–1914)
  Le Courrier français (1948–1950)
 Le Crapouillot
 Le Cri de Paris
 Cuadernos
 La Cuisinière Cordon Bleu

D

 Le Débat
 Défense de l'Occident
 Delo Truda
 Derrière le miroir
 Deutsch–Französische Jahrbücher
 Diapason
 Dionée
 Do Not Look at the Sun
 Documents
 Le Droit des femmes

E

 L'Écho des savanes
 L'Éclipse
 L'Écran fantastique
 Les Écrits nouveaux
  Éléments
 Elle
 Energy Technology Perspectives
 L'Esprit Nouveau
 L'Estampe Moderne
 L'Estampe originale
 L'Étudiant noir
 Europe-Action
 Europe Échecs
 L'Europe orientale
 The European
 L'Express

F

 Famille chrétienne
 Femina
 La Femme
 Femme Actuelle
 Femmes françaises
 Le Figaro Magazine
 Le Film français
 Le Follet
 France-Amérique
 France Football
 La Fraternité, Journal moral et politique

G

 Gazette des Beaux-Arts
 Gazette du Bon Ton
 Giustizia e Libertà
 Les Grandes Aventures
 La Guerre Sociale

H
 L'Histoire
 L'Humanité Dimanche

I

 Ici Paris
 L'Illustration
 L’Independence arabe
 L'Industrie Vélocipédique
 L'Infini
 L'Intelligence
 L'Intermédiaire des chercheurs et curieux
 Investir

J

 Jazz Hot
 Jazz Magazine
 Je sais tout
 Jeune Afrique
 La Jeune Belgique
 Journal amusant
 Journal des dames et des modes
 Journal of Film Preservation
 Jours de France
 Joystick

K
 Khamsin
 Kultura

L

 Les Écrits nouveaux
 La Revue hebdomadaire
 Les Cahiers de la photographie
 Les Écrits nouveaux
 La Licorne
 Lire
 Lui
 Lyon Capitale
 Lys rouge

M

 Mad Movies
 Madame Figaro
 Le Magazin pittoresque
 Marianne
 Marie Claire
 Max
 Le Ménestrel
 La mère éducatrice
 Merlin
 Meşveret
 Mieux Vivre Votre Argent
 MilK Magazine
 Minotaure
 Mirage
 La Mode Illustrée
 Modes & Travaux
 Monde (review)
 Monde dramatique
 Le Monde de l'éducation
 Le Monde libertaire
 Le Monde mensuel
 Le Monde de la musique
 Le Moniteur des travaux publics et du bâtiment

N

 Le Nain jaune
 La Nation française
 Le Navire d'Argent
 Noi donne
 Notre Temps
 Le Nouveau Détective
 Le Nouvel Économiste
 Le Nouveau Magazine Littéraire
 Nouvelle École
 Nouvelle Revue Française
 La Nouvelle Vie Ouvrière
 Les Nouvelles littéraires
 La Nouvelle Revue d'Histoire

O

 Objectif et action Mutualistes
 L'Obs
 L'ŒIL
 L'Officiel Hommes
 Onze Mondial
 L'Organisateur

P

 Pariscope
 Paris Match
 Paris Passion
 Le Particulier
 La Petite Illustration
 Pilote
 Pleine Vie
 Le Point
 Pour Vous
 Positif
 Présence Africaine
 Preuves
 Prima

Q
 Questions féministes

R

 La Révolution prolétarienne
 La Revue Blanche
 Revue et gazette musicale de Paris
 Revue d'histoire du fascisme
 Revue d'Histoire littéraire de la France
 Revue Illustrée
 La Revue du mois
 La Revue musicale
 Revue du monde musulman
 Revue Noire
 Revue de l'Orient Latin
 Revue politique et littéraire
 La Revue du vin de France
 La Revue wagnérienne
 Rivarol
 Russian Riviera

S

 Sciences et Avenir
 La Semaine de Suzette
 Les Soirées de Paris
 Les Spectacles de Paris
 La Stratégie
 Studio magazine
 Le Surrealisme au service de la revolution

T

 Tel Quel
 Télé 7 Jours
 Télé Poche
 Le Téméraire
 Les Temps modernes
 Têtu
 Tilt
 TV Magazine

U
 L'Univers illustré
 Al-Urwah al-Wuthqa
 L'Usine nouvelle

V

 Verve
 La Vie
 La Vie Parisienne
 Vogue France
 Voici
 La volonté de paix

W
 The Wipers Times

Y
 L'Ymagier

References

France
Magazines

Magazines